Multi-Man is a DC Comics supervillain.

Multi Man or Multi-Man may also refer to:

Multi Man, a Hanna-Barbera superhero in the animated television series The Impossibles
MULTIMAN (born 1983), Spanish electronic music composer (psytrance, techno, experimental), graphic and web designer, photographer, mixing & mastering engineer.
Multiman (born 1958), Danish-American record producer and songwriter
Multi-Man Publishing, an American game company

See also
Multiple Man, or Jamie Madrox, a Marvel Comics superhero